This is a list of former child actors from the United Kingdom. These actors were aged 17 or less at the time they started acting but are currently 18 or over. The list also includes deceased child actors. Movies and/or TV series they appeared in are mentioned only if they were still a child at the time of filming. For a list of current child actors from the UK see List of British current child actors.

A
Zaraah Abrahams (born 1987)
Jenny Agutter (born 1952) 
Qasim Akhtar (born 1991)
Eubha Akilade (born 1998)
James Alexandrou (born 1985)
John Alford (born 1981)
Isabelle Allen (born 2002)
Jasmine Armfield (born 1998)
George Armstrong (born 1962)
Devon Anderson (born 1987)
Julie Andrews (born 1935)
Jane Asher (born 1946)
Joe Ashman (born 1995)
Sam Aston (born 1993)
Michael Audreson (born 1956)
Afshan Azad (born 1988)

B
Gillian Bailey (born 1955)
Jonathan Bailey (born 1988)
Alex Bain (born 2001)
Christian Bale (born 1974)
Manpreet Bambra (born 1992)
Jessica Barden (born 1992)
Mischa Barton (born 1986)
Matthew Beard (born 1989)
Charlotte Beaumont (born 1995)
Christopher Beeny (1941–2020)
Jamie Bell (born 1986)
Eliza Bennett (born 1992)
Johnny Bennett (born 1998)
Perry Benson (born 1961)
Rosie Bentham (born 2001)
Master Betty (1791–1874)
Sean Biggerstaff (born 1983)
Harley Bird (born 2001)
Gemma Bissix (born 1983)
Chris Bisson (born 1975)
Niamh Blackshaw (born 1999)
Isabella Blake-Thomas (born 2002)
Holly Bodimeade (born 1995)
Josh Bolt (born 1994)
Jamie Borthwick (born 1994)
Samuel Bottomley (born 2001)
Hollie-Jay Bowes (born 1989)
Isa Bowman (1874–1958)
Lucy Boynton (born 1994)
Lindy Brill (born 1963)
Charlie Brooks (born 1981)
Josh Brown (born 1990)
Millie Bobby Brown (born 2004)
Céline Buckens (born 1996)
Emily Burnett (born 1997)
Asa Butterfield (born 1997)
Scarlett Byrne (born 1990)
Hetti Bywater (born 1994)

C
Rhys Cadman (born 1998)
Emily Carey (born 2003)
Sally Carman (born 1981)
Todd Carty (born 1963)
Grace Cassidy (born 1993)
Natalie Cassidy (born 1983)
Raffey Cassidy (born 2001)
Earl Cave (born 2000)
Sheila Chandra (born 1965)
Keith Chegwin (1957–2017) 
Navin Chowdhry (born 1971)
Shefali Chowdhury (born 1988)
Kacey Clarke (born 1988)
Barney Clark (born 1993)
John Clark (born 1932)
Petula Clark (born 1932)
Klariza Clayton (born 1989)
Nicholas Cochrane (born 1973)
Julie Dawn Cole (born 1957)
Steven Cole (born 1982)
Raphaël Coleman (1994–2020)
Jodie Comer (born 1993)
Kelly Condron (born 1982)
Kit Connor (born 2004)
Sebastian Croft (born 2001)
Abigail Cruttenden (born 1968)

D
Ellie Darcey-Alden (born 1999)
Eileen Davies (born 1948)
Robin Davies (1954–2010)
Ruth Davies (born 1965)
Ashley Taylor Dawson (born 1982)
Fern Deacon (born 1998)
Jack Deam (born 1972)
Letitia Dean (born 1967)
Cleo Demetriou (born 2001)
Richard Dempsey (born 1973)
Sue Devaney (born 1967)
Frank Dillane (born 1991)
Declan Donnelly (born 1975)
Karen Dotrice (born 1955)
Tyger Drew-Honey (born 1996)
Madeline Duggan (born 1994)
Phoebe Dynevor (born 1995)

E
Holly Earl (born 1992)
Harry Eden (born 1990)
Jennifer Ellison (born 1983)
Alfred Enoch (born 1988)

F
Tom Felton (born 1987)
Peter Firth (born 1953)
Lorna Fitzgerald (born 1996)
Alexandra Fletcher (born 1976)
Shannon Flynn (born 1996)
Georgia May Foote (born 1991)
Delanie Forbes (born 1976)
James Fox (born 1939)
Jessica Fox (born 1983)
Pamela Franklin (born 1950)
Nell Tiger Free (born 1999)
Matilda Freeman (born 2004)
Poppy Lee Friar (born 1995)

G
Matthew Garber (1956–1977)
Michelle Gayle (born 1971)
Samia Ghadie (born 1982)
Millie Gibson (born 2004)
Joseph Gilgun (born 1984)
Simon Gipps-Kent (1958–1987)
Oliver Golding (born 1993)
Tylan Grant (born 2001)
Jan Graveson (born 1965)
Simon Gregson (born 1974)
Tallulah Greive (born 1997)
Ciarán Griffiths (born 1983)
Josie Griffiths (born 2000)
Rupert Grint (born 1988)

H
Chelsea Halfpenny (born 1991)
Jill Halfpenny (born 1975)
Adrian Hall (born 1959)
Alan Halsall (born 1982)
Dani Harmer (born 1989)
Keeley Hawes (born 1976)
Chloe Hawthorn (born 2002)
David Hemmings (1941–2003) 
Isaac Hempstead Wright (born 1999)
Georgie Henley (born 1995)
Jessica Henwick (born 1992)
Joshua Herdman (born 1987)
Amy-Leigh Hickman (born 1997)
Freddie Highmore (born 1992)
Hannah Hobley (born 1988)
Isabel Hodgins (born 1993)
Tom Holland (born 1996)
Jack Hollington (born 2001)
Ellis Hollins (born 1999)
Nicholas Hoult (born 1989)
Callum Scott Howells (born 1999)
Rachel Hurd-Wood (born 1990)
Lucy Hutchinson (born 2003)
Tracy Hyde (born 1959)

I
Kerry Ingram (born 1999)
Millie Innes (born 2000)

J
Robbie Jarvis (born 1986)
Scarlett Alice Johnson (born 1985)
Charlie Jones (born 1996)
Emilia Jones (born 2002)
Felicity Jones (born 1983)
Charlotte Jordan (born 1994)
Elliott Jordan (born 1983)
Samuel Joslin (born 2002)
Jacqueline Jossa (born 1992)
Megan Jossa (born 1996)
Noah Jupe (born 2005)

K
Brad Kavanagh (born 1992)
Robbie Kay (born 1995)
Gillian Kearney (born 1972)
Mimi Keene (born 1998)
Dafne Keen (born 2005)
Tilly Keeper (born 1997)
Holly Kenny (born 1995)
Skandar Keynes (born 1991)
Honor Kneafsey (born 2004)
Rosalind Knight (1933–2020)
Tommy Knight (born 1993)
Keira Knightley (born 1985)
Andrew Knott (born 1979)
Bobby Knutt (1945–2017)

L
Lily Laight (born 2001)
Bonnie Langford (born 1964)
Jody Latham (born 1983)
Lucien Laviscount (born 1992)
Alex Lawther (born 1995)
Ellie Leach (born 2001)
Mark Lester (born 1958)
Gabriella Leon (born 1996)
Georgina Leonidas (born 1990)
Katie Leung (born 1987)
Matthew Lewis (born 1989)
Dylan Llewellyn (born 1992)
Georgia Lock (born 1996)
James Lomas (born 1990)
Jessica Lord (born 1998)

M
Kate Maberly (born 1982)
Lee MacDonald (born 1968)
Lewis MacDougall (born 2002)
Robert Madge (born 1996)
George Maguire (born 1990)
Holly Mai (born 1991)
Angelica Mandy (born 1992)
Ramona Marquez (born 2001)
Sally Ann Matthews (born 1970)
Bailey May (born 2002)
Jennie McAlpine (born 1984)
Martine McCutcheon (born 1976)
Roddy McDowall (1928–1998)
Shona McGarty (born 1991)
Mia McKenna-Bruce (born 1997)
Jack McMullen (born 1991)
Ant McPartlin (born 1975)
Amanda Mealing (born 1967)
Paul Medford (born 1967)
Harry Melling (born 1989) 
William Melling (born 1994) 
Sinead Michael (born 1998)
Danny Miller (born 1991)
Hayley Mills (born 1946)
Bill Milner (born 1995)
Hugh Mitchell (born 1989)
Isobelle Molloy (born 2000)
Hannah Moncur (born 2004)
Liam Mower (born 1992)
Elle Mulvaney (born 2002)
Danny Murphy (born 2004)
Erkan Mustafa (born 1970)

N
Rukku Nahar (born 1996)
Mya-Lecia Naylor (2002–2019)
Anthony Newley (1931–1999)
Eve Newton (born 1998)
Luke Newton (born 1997)
Paul Nicholls (born 1979)
Reece Noi (born 1988)

O
Tina O'Brien (born 1983)
Ruby O'Donnell (born 2000)
Akai Osei (born 1999)

P
Regé-Jean Page (born 1988)
Milo Parker (born 2002)
Nico Parker (born 2004)
Sacha Parkinson (born 1992)
Dev Patel (born 1990)
Chris Perry-Metcalf (born 1989)
James Phelps (born 1986)
Oliver Phelps (born 1986)
Joe-Warren Plant (born 2002)
Anna Popplewell (born 1988)
Bel Powley (born 1992)
Billy Price (born 2000)
Heydon Prowse (born 1981)
Ella Purnell (born 1996)

Q
Holly Quin-Ankrah (born 1987)
Ray Quinn (born 1988)

R
Daniel Radcliffe (born 1989)
Tilly Ramsay (born 2001)
Bella Ramsey (born 2003)
Sam Retford (born 1999)
Jessica Revell (born 1994)
Christopher Reynalds (born 1952)
Dakota Blue Richards (born 1994)
Heather Ripley (born 1959)
Alex Roe (born 1990)
Laura Rollins (born 1988)
Jemima Rooper (born 1981)
Camilla and Rebecca Rosso (born 1994)
Charlie Rowe (born 1996)
William Rush (born 1994)
Annie Russell (1864–1936)
Gary Russell (born 1963)
Debbie Russ (born 1960)
Michelle Ryan (born 1984)
Rebecca Ryan (born 1991)

S
Laura Sadler (1980–2003)
Nikki Sanderson (born 1984)
Sunetra Sarker (born 1973)
Jack Scanlon (born 1998)
Oliver Stokes (born 1998)
Gian Sammarco (born 1970)
Thomas Sangster (born 1990)
Edward Savage (born 1989)
Kaya Scodelario (born 1992)
Jack P. Shepherd (born 1988)
Georgina Sherrington (born 1985)
Adele Silva (born 1980)
Sophie Simnett (born 1997)
Joshua Sinclair-Evans (born 1995)
Mimi Slinger (born 2003)
Colson Smith (born 1998)
Maisie Smith (born 2001)
Mia Smith (born 1994)
Lindsey Stagg (born 1970)
Isobel Steele (born 2000)
Harvey Spencer Stephens (born 1970)
Sophie Stuckey (born 1991)
Melissa Suffield (born 1992)
Sara Sugarman (born 1962)

T
Elizabeth Taylor (1932–2011) (English-born)
Georgia Taylor (born 1980)
Tom Taylor (born 2001)
Eden Taylor-Draper (born 1997)
Hannah Taylor-Gordon (born 1987)
Juno Temple (born 1989)
Ellen Terry (1847–1928)
Justine Thornton (born 1970)
Hero Fiennes Tiffin (born 1997)
Elliott Tittensor (born 1989)
Luke Tittensor (born 1989)
Eleanor Tomlinson (born 1992)
Susan Tully (born 1967)
Thomas Turgoose (born 1992)
Lacey Turner (born 1988)
Sophie Turner (born 1996)

V
Wendy van der Plank (born 1979)

W
Fiona Wade (born 1979)
Gary Warren (born 1954)
Dennis Waterman (born 1948)
Emma Watson (born 1990)
Jamie Waylett (born 1989)
Richard Wisker (born 1995)
Sheila White (1948–2018)
Jack Wild (1952–2006)
Maisie Williams (born 1997)
Amir Wilson (born 2004)
Molly Windsor (born 1997)
Kate Winslet (born 1975)
Lara Wollington (born 2003)
Carla Woodcock (born 1998)
Adam Woodyatt (born 1968)
Eleanor Worthington Cox (born 2001)
Bethan Wright (born 1996)
Bonnie Wright (born 1991)

Y
Danny Young (born 1986)
Luke Youngblood (born 1986)

See also
List of British current child actors

List
United Kingdom, former